Axios is an association for Orthodox Christians and Byzantine Rite  Catholics who are gay, lesbian, bisexual, or transgender which was founded in Los Angeles in 1980.  The organization has chapters in Washington DC, Atlanta, New York City, Colorado, Ohio, Pennsylvania, Chicago, Boston, Florida, San Francisco, Detroit, Las Vegas, and  outside the U.S., in Toronto, Canada and Australia.

Mission
The Orthodox Church's teaching is that same-sex relations are sinful in the same manner as all heterosexual practice outside of marriage. Axios also professes that members' "sexuality and love are God given and healthy," but denies any morally significant distinction ceteris paribus between heterosexual and homosexual expressions.

See also

Courage International
Homosexuality and Christianity

Further reading
Sexual Orientation and Gender Expression in Social Work Practice: Working with Gay, Lesbian, Bisexual, and Transgender People by Deana F. Morrow and Lori Messinger 
Christian Science: Its Encounter with Lesbian/Gay America by Bruce Stores 
Coming Out in Christianity by Melissa M. Wilcox

Sources
Homosexuality in the Orthodox Church, by Justin R. Cannon
God Forbid: Religion and Sex in American Public Life by Kathleen M. Sands

References

External links
Axios in California
Axios in Canada

Eastern Orthodox organizations established in the 20th century
LGBT Christian organizations
International LGBT organizations
LGBT and Catholicism
LGBT and Eastern Orthodoxy
Organizations established in 1980
1980 establishments in California